Andrés Guibert Sangerton (born October 28, 1968), commonly known as Andrés Guibert, is a Cuban-Puerto Rican former professional basketball player. In 1993, Guibert defected to Puerto Rico, from the Cuban delegation at the 1993 Central American and Caribbean Games, that was held in Ponce.

Professional career
Guibert played in the National Basketball Association (NBA) for the Minnesota Timberwolves (1993–94 and 1994–95 seasons). In 22 NBA games, he averaged 2.7 points per game, and 2.8 rebounds per game, in 9.1 minutes per game. He was selected by the Toronto Raptors in the 1995 NBA Expansion Draft, but was waived before the 1995–96 regular season started.

After that, he played in Greece's top-tier Greek Basket League, for Sporting (1996–97), Apollon Patras (1998–99), Near East Kaisariani (1999–00), Heraklion Crete (2000–01) and KAOD (2001–02).

He also played in Italy's top-tier Lega Basket Serie A for Scavolini Pesaro (1997–98) and Benetton Treviso (2000–01), and in Puerto Rico's top-tier Baloncesto Superior Nacional, for Ponce Lions (2003–04).

National team career
Guibert was a member of the senior Cuban national team. With Cuba he played at the 1989 FIBA AmeriCup, the 1992 FIBA AmeriCup, and the 1993 FIBA AmeriCup.

References

External links
nba.com Profile
Italian League Profile 
Spanish League Archive Profile 
Puerto Rican League Profile 
LatinBasket.com Profile
ProBallers.com Profile

1968 births
Living people
Apollon Patras B.C. players
Basketball players from Havana
CB Valladolid players
Centers (basketball)
Club Ourense Baloncesto players
Criollos de Caguas basketball players
Cuban expatriate basketball people in Puerto Rico
Cuban emigrants to Puerto Rico
Cuban men's basketball players
Cuban expatriate basketball people in Greece
Cuban expatriate basketball people in Italy
Cuban expatriate basketball people in Spain
Cuban expatriate basketball people in the United States
Defecting sportspeople of Cuba
Irakleio B.C. players
K.A.O.D. B.C. players
Leones de Ponce basketball players
Liga ACB players
Minnesota Timberwolves players
National Basketball Association players from Cuba
Near East B.C. players
Pallacanestro Treviso players
Puerto Rican men's basketball players
Power forwards (basketball)
Sporting basketball players
Toronto Raptors expansion draft picks
Undrafted National Basketball Association players
Victoria Libertas Pallacanestro players